George Henry "Admiral" Schlei (January 12, 1878 - January 24, 1958) was a Major League Baseball catcher. He played all or part of eight seasons in the majors, between 1904 and 1911, for the Cincinnati Reds and New York Giants. He was a starting catcher from the 1904 to the 1909 season. He was the first Reds catcher to wear shin guards.

Schlei attended St. Xavier High School in Cincinnati.

References

External links

1878 births
1958 deaths
Major League Baseball catchers
Cincinnati Reds players
New York Giants (NL) players
Louisville Colonels (minor league) players
Memphis Chickasaws players
Baseball players from Cincinnati
St. Xavier High School (Ohio) people